Lecointea is a genus of flowering plants in the family Fabaceae. It contains the following species:
 Lecointea amazonica Ducke
 Lecointea ovalifolia J.F. Macbr.
 Lecointea peruviana J.F. Macbr.
 Lecointea tango (Standl.) Emygdio & A.G. Andrade

Its native range stretches from south-eastern Mexico to Southern Tropical America. It is found in Belize, Bolivia, Brazil, Colombia, Costa Rica, Ecuador, French Guiana, Guyana, Honduras, Mexico, Nicaragua, Panamá, Peru, Suriname and Venezuela.

The genus name of Lecointea is in honour of Paul Georges Aimé Le Cointe (1870–1956), a French botanist who worked in Brazil. He was also the director of a museum in Belém. It was first described and published in Arch. Jard. Bot. Rio de Janeiro Vol.3 on page 128 in 1922.

References

Exostyleae
Taxonomy articles created by Polbot
Fabaceae genera
Plants described in 1922
Flora of Mexico
Flora of Central America
Flora of northern South America
Flora of western South America
Flora of Brazil
Taxa named by Adolpho Ducke